Regent Centre is a Tyne and Wear Metro station in Zone B, serving the suburb of Gosforth, Newcastle upon Tyne. It joined the network on 10 May 1981, following the opening of the second phase of the network, between South Gosforth and Bank Foot.

History
Regent Centre is situated at the site of the former West Gosforth station, which opened in June 1905, as part of the Ponteland and Darras Hall branch of the Blyth and Tyne Railway. The line closed to passengers in June 1929, with the station closing to goods services in August 1967.

West Gosforth station consisted of two side platforms, a simple pitched roof station building, and a signal box. The station was demolished entirely in the late 1970s, in order to allow for the construction of Regent Centre Interchange.

Regent Centre Interchange consists of a two platform station below street level, covered by the station concourse. A multi-storey car park and bus station are located on the upper level, with a tall canopy covering the entrance to the station building, extending across the bus station.

Facilities 
Step-free access is available at all stations across the Tyne and Wear Metro network, with two lifts providing step-free access to platforms. As part of the Metro: All Change programme, new lifts and escalators were installed at the station in 2013.

The station is equipped with ticket machines, seating, next train information displays, timetable posters, and an emergency help point on both platforms. Ticket machines are able to accept payment with credit and debit card (including contactless payment), notes and coins. The station is also fitted with smartcard validators, which feature at all stations across the network. The station houses a newsagent's shop in the ticket hall.

There is a large pay and display car park available at the station, with 183 spaces, plus eight accessible spaces. There is also the provision for cycle parking, with four cycle lockers and five cycle pods available for use. A bus interchange is also available at the station, providing frequent connections in and around Newcastle upon Tyne, North Tyneside and Northumberland.

Services 
, the station is served by up to five trains per hour on weekdays and Saturday, and up to four trains per hour during the evening and on Sunday.

Rolling stock used: Class 599 Metrocar

Bus station
The bus station is located above the Tyne and Wear Metro station. It opened in May 1981, and similarly to Heworth and Four Lane Ends, was purpose-built for the Tyne and Wear Metro network.

Regent Centre Interchange is served by Arriva North East and Go North East's local bus services, with frequent routes serving Newcastle upon Tyne, North Tyneside and Northumberland. The bus station has five departure stands (lettered A–E). Each stand is fitted with seating, next bus information displays, and timetable posters.

Art 

 A large mural features on the external wall of the station building. Created by Anthony Lowe, Metro Morning was commissioned in 1988, and depicts passengers travelling in a representation of a rush-hour train.
 Nic Armstrong's Have You Paid and Displayed? was commissioned in 2001, and features in the stairwell of the multi-storey car park. It depicts the everyday lives of the car park's users and Tyne and Wear Metro passengers, set amongst contrasting landscape images.

References

External links 
 
 Timetable and station information for Regent Centre

Tyne and Wear Metro Green line stations
Transport in Tyne and Wear
Bus stations in Tyne and Wear
1981 establishments in England
Railway stations in Great Britain opened in 1981